Divine Operating System is the second studio album released by Supreme Beings of Leisure, an electronic/trip hop band, in 2003.

Track listing
All tracks by Supreme Beings of Leisure

"Give Up" – 3:50
"Ghetto" – 4:22
"Catch Me" – 4:20
"Get Away" – 3:22
"Rock and a Hard Place" – 4:25
"Calamity Jane" – 5:19
"Divine" – 4:26
"Touch Me" – 4:11
"So Much More" – 5:54
"Freezer" – 4:25
"Perfect" – 5:01

Bonus DVD
"Give Up"
"Ghetto"
"Catch Me"
"Touch Me"

Personnel
Tony Wright – cover art
Jason Arnold – mixing
Flavia Cureteu – design
DJ Swamp – scratching
Jesse Gorman – assistant engineer
Suzie Katayama – string arrangements, string conductor
Lory Lacy – flute
Bill Meyers – string arrangements, string conductor
Andres Moreta – art direction
Jimi Randolph – engineer, mixing
Manoochehr Sadeghi – santur
Ramin Sakurai – programming, multi instruments, producer, engineer, string arrangements, mixing, synthesizer strings
Christine Sirois – assistant engineer
Sheldon Strickland – bass, producer
Rick Torres – guitar, programming
Brad Wood – producer

References

External links
Divine Operating System at Discogs

2003 albums
Supreme Beings of Leisure albums
Contemporary R&B albums by American artists
Disco albums by American artists
Soul albums by American artists